The 1988 Australia rugby union tour of England, Scotland and Italy was a series of fifteen matches played by the Australia national rugby union team (the Wallabies) in England, Scotland and Italy (with one match in Wales) from October to December 1988. The Wallabies won eleven of their matches and lost the other four; they lost to England in their first international match but beat Scotland in the second and concluded the tour with a further international win over Italy.

Matches 
Scores and results list Australia's points tally first.

Touring party
Coach : Bob Dwyer
Assistant coach : Bob Templeton
Tour Manager: A. J. Conway
Captain: Nick Farr-Jones

References

1988 rugby union tours
1988
1988
1988
1988
1988–89 in European rugby union
1988–89 in English rugby union
1988–89 in Scottish rugby union
1988–89 in Italian rugby union
1989 in Australian rugby union